Jim May is a retired American soccer goalkeeper who played professionally in the North American Soccer League and the Major Indoor Soccer League.

May first attended SUNY Cobleskill where he was a 1972 junior college Honorable Mention (third team) All American soccer player.  He earned an associate degree from Cobleskill in 1972 and was later inducted into the school's Athletic Hall of Fame.  He then transferred to SUNY Brockport where he was a two-year starter on the men's soccer team.  He was inducted into the school's Athletic Hall of Fame in 2004.  In 1975, The Rochester Lancers selected May in the first round of the North American Soccer League draft. During his tenure there he collected Pele's jersey after a match against the New York Cosmos. In 1978, he moved to the Cleveland Force of the Major Indoor Soccer League.  In 1979, the Buffalo Stallions selected May with the first pick of the MISL expansion draft.

After retirement he became vice president and general manager of the Buffalo Blizzard from 1992 to 1999. He also coached the team between 1994 and 1996.  In 2007, May was inducted into the Greater Buffalo Sports Hall of Fame.

References

External links
NASL/MISL stats

1953 births
Living people
American soccer coaches
American soccer players
Buffalo Stallions players
Cleveland Force (original MISL) players
Major Indoor Soccer League (1978–1992) players
National Professional Soccer League (1984–2001) coaches
North American Soccer League (1968–1984) players
North American Soccer League (1968–1984) indoor players
Rochester Lancers (1967–1980) players
Soccer players from New York (state)
Association football goalkeepers
Sportspeople from Westchester County, New York
State University of New York at Cobleskill alumni
Brockport Golden Eagles men's soccer players